"Sunlight" is a song written and produced by Spanish disc jockey DJ Sammy with vocals provided by Dutch singer Loona. It was released in May 2002 as the second single off DJ Sammy's second studio album, Heaven (2002), and reached number eight in the United Kingdom, number 21 in Ireland, and number 28 in the Netherlands.

Music video
There were two videos made for the single. One video featured time lapse photography of locations around the world of people walking in urban areas, traffic, clouds drifting on mountains and waves on a beach.

The other video featured time lapse photography of Palma de Mallorca and Loona singing on the beach.

Track listings

Spanish maxi-CD single
 "Sunlight" (sunrise mix) – 3:59
 "Sunlight" (sunset mix) – 5:22
 "Sunlight" (DJ Shog remix) – 7:46
 "Sunlight" (Martin Eyerer remix) – 9:56
 "Sunlight" (Minimalistix remix) – 7:34
 "Sunlight" (Oliver Lieb remix) – 5:08
 "Sunlight" (sunset mix instrumental) – 5:08
 "Sunlight" (bossa nova vibes)	– 3:18

UK enhanced CD single
 "Sunlight" (radio edit)
 "Sunlight" (Milky remix edit)
 "Heaven" (Yanou's Candlelight mix)
 "Sunlight" (video)

UK cassette single
 "Sunlight" (radio edit)
 "Sunlight" (Milky remix edit)

Australian CD single
 "Sunlight" (sunrise mix) – 4:00
 "Sunlight" (bossa nova vibes)	– 3:19
 "Sunlight" (sunset mix) – 5:22
 "Sunlight" (DJ Shog remix) – 7:48
 "Sunlight" (Minimalistix remix) – 7:35
 "Sunlight" (Oliver Lieb remix) – 7:47

Charts

Weekly charts

Year-end charts

Release history

References

DJ Sammy songs
2002 singles
2002 songs
Data Records singles